Senator Flood may refer to:

Henry D. Flood (1865–1921), Virginia State Senate
Mike Flood (politician) (born 1975), Nebraska State Senate
Patrick Flood (born 1951), Maine State Senate
Thomas H. Flood (1804–1873), Virginia State Senate